Italy have competed in all the Rugby World Cup tournaments, having made their first appearance in the inaugural 1987 tournament. They have finished third in their pool at every tournament, except in 1999, the only tournament where they lost more than two games. Having never finished in the top two in their pool, they have never qualified to progress to the quarter-finals. They have won the most matches of those that have never made it to the quarter-finals.

Because they finished third in Pool C of the 2007 Rugby World Cup in France, they automatically qualified to compete in the 2011 tournament in New Zealand. A similar finishing position in that tournament saw them automatically qualify for the 2015 World Cup in England, where they retained the third place and the automatic qualification for France 2003

By position

Matches

1987 Rugby World Cup

Pool 3 matches -

1991 Rugby World Cup
Pool 1 matches -

1995 Rugby World Cup
Pool B matches -

1999 Rugby World Cup
Pool B matches -

2003 Rugby World Cup
Group D matches -

2007 Rugby World Cup

Pool C matches -

2011 Rugby World Cup

Pool C of the 2011 Rugby World Cup began on 11 September 2011 and was completed on 2 October. The pool was composed of Australia, Ireland, Italy, Russia and the United States.

All times are local New Zealand time (UTC+12 until 24 September, UTC+13 from 25 September)

2015 Rugby World Cup

2019 Rugby World Cup

Pool B

Notes:
As a result of inclement weather caused by Typhoon Hagibis this match was cancelled and awarded as a 0–0 draw.

Hosting

The Rugby World Cup is held every four years, and tends to alternate between the northern and southern hemispheres. Every northern hemisphere tournament so far has been held in Europe, however Japan won the bid to host the 2019 Rugby World Cup. Italy has yet to host the World Cup, although the Italian Rugby Federation made unsuccessful bids for the 2015 and 2019 competitions.

References
 Davies, Gerald (2004) The History of the Rugby World Cup (Sanctuary Publishing Ltd,
 Farr-Jones, Nick, (2003). Story of the Rugby World Cup, Australian Post Corporation,

World Cup
Rugby World Cup by nation